The Family Justice Courts (FJC) is a grouping of courts in the judicial system of Singapore that comprises the Youth Courts, Family Courts and High Court (Family Division). The Youth Courts hear cases related to children and young persons, the Family Courts hear all family proceedings except cases that fall under the Youth Courts, and the Family Division of the High Court primarily hears appeals against the decisions of the Family Courts and the Youth Courts.

History  
In 2013, the Committee for Family Justice was formed to review how Singapore’s family justice system may be reformed to address the needs of youth and families in distress. It recommended setting up the Family Justice Court.

The Family Justice Courts of Singapore are established pursuant to the Family Justice Act which was passed by the Singapore Parliament on 4 August 2014.

Legislation 
The FJC deals with cases involving the following legislations:
 Family Justice Act
 Administration of Muslim Law Act (Cap. 3)
Adoption of Children Act (Cap. 4)
 Children and Young Persons Act (Cap. 38)
 Criminal Procedure Code (Cap. 68)
 Family Justice Act 2014 (Act 27 of 2014)
 Guardianship of Infants Act (Cap. 122)
Inheritance (Family Provision) Act (Cap. 138)
 International Child Abduction Act (Cap. 143C)
 Intestate Succession Act (Cap. 146)
 Legitimacy Act (Cap. 162)
 Maintenance of Parents Act (Cap. 167B)
 Maintenance Orders (Facilities for Enforcement) Act (Cap. 168)
 Maintenance Orders (Reciprocal Enforcement) Act (Cap. 169)
 Mental Capacity Act (Cap. 177A)
 Mental Health (Care and Treatment) Act (Cap. 178A)
 Probate and Administration Act (Cap. 251)
 Status of Children (Assisted Reproduction Technology) Act 2013 (Act 16 of 2013)
 Supreme Court of Judicature Act (Cap. 322)
 Voluntary Sterilization Act (Cap. 347)
 Wills Act (Cap 352)
 Women’s Charter (Cap. 353)

It handled a total of 27,228 cases in 2015.

iFAMS 
Integrated Family Application Management System (iFAMS) is an end-to-end paperless system that predominantly deals with family-related cases brought before FJC.

References 

Courts in Singapore